The Battle of Tebbs' Bend (or Tebbs Bend or Green River) was fought on July 4, 1863, near the Green River in Taylor County, Kentucky during Morgan's Raid in the American Civil War.  Despite being badly outnumbered, elements of the Union army thwarted repeated attacks by Confederate Brig. Gen. John Hunt Morgan's dismounted cavalry.

Overview
Brigadier General Morgan and his 2,460 handpicked Confederate cavalrymen rode west from Sparta in middle Tennessee on June 11, 1863, intending to divert the attention of the Union Army of the Ohio from Southern forces in the state. Morgan moved northward on June 23, bound for Kentucky.  On the night of July 2, he crossed the rain-swollen Cumberland River and advanced into Kentucky, proceeding as far as Cane Valley, camping between Campbellsville and Columbia. The next day, he planned to cross the Green River at Tebbs' Bend, which was guarded by five companies of about 200 men of the 25th Michigan Infantry led by Colonel Orlando Hurley Moore (July 13, 1827 to October 31, 1890).  Moore had erected earthworks in the woods near the river crossing, guarded by a line of abatis of felled trees and several forward rifle pits.  His goal was to protect the Lebanon-Campbellsville-Columbia Turnpike, a vital supply line and the easiest route for Morgan to take to reach Louisville.

Morgan divided his force, sending the bulk of his cavalry to flank the small garrison and cut off their avenue of retreat.  At sunrise on July 4, Union pickets opened fire on approaching enemy cavalrymen.  Soon, Morgan's artillery answered, wounding two Union soldiers in the rifle pits.  About 7 a.m., Morgan called a cease fire and sent forward three officers under a flag of truce, demanding that Moore surrender, wishing to avoid further bloodshed. However, the Union commander refused and firing resumed.  Sharpshooters soon silenced Morgan's artillery battery of four guns.

Morgan sent forward two dismounted regiments under Col. Adam R. Johnson, about 400 troopers, who easily overran the advanced rifle pits.  However, the attack stalled under heavy fire from Federals concealed behind the abatis. Morgan then sent in the 5th Kentucky Cavalry from Col. Basil W. Duke's brigade to support Johnson.  Over a three-hour period, Morgan pushed forward a total of eight separate attacks, with each one being repulsed, including the flanking column.  Finally acknowledging that he could not seize the fortifications, Morgan sent another delegation under a flag of truce to Colonel Moore to request permission to collect his wounded and bury his dead.  That task completed, Morgan withdrew southward along the bluffs of the Green River, finally crossing the bend at Johnson Ford and heading back towards Campbellsville.  The next day, he would fight again at the Battle of Lebanon.

Casualties
Morgan lost 35 killed and 45 wounded, while Moore counted 6 killed and 23 wounded. Of significance, among Morgan's casualties were 24 experienced officers, who were a particular target of the Michigan sharpshooters.

A Confederate Monument which says, "They have not been forgotten by their countrymen," was erected at the Tebbs' Bend Battlefield in 1872. In 1997, the site was listed on the National Register of Historic Places; the battlefield itself was listed in 1999.

150th anniversary
On June 8, 2013, some two hundred persons attended a re-enactment of the battle of Tebbs Bend to observe the 150th anniversary of the fighting. A new marker dedicated to Confederate Army Private Frank Voss of Maryland was unveiled, with some of his descendants present for the occasion. The ceremony was planned by historian Betty Jane Gorin-Smith and other members of the Tebbs Bend Battlefield Association, including its president, Cheryl Tillery. "We are here to remember those men who gave the full measure of devotion for causes in which they sincerely believed," said Gorin-Smith.

General Morgan asked for a truce so that the Confederates could bring in the injured and dead, who were interred in a mass grave. "It is said that the blood ran down through the yard into the turnpike road," Gorin-Smith recalled.
Only the Confederate cemetery remains at Tebbs Bend; the bodies of Union soldiers were buried near the Green River stockade and later removed to the Lebanon National Cemetery in Lebanon, Kentucky. Gorin-Smith read a roll call of the dead buried in the cemetery and acknowledged the unknown soldiers who perished there as well.

According to century-old newspaper clipping, on June 3, 1911, some four thousand attended a 48th anniversary remembrance of the battle. This particular gathering was reportedly the largest in the history of the Green River Valley.

See also
 List of battles fought in Kentucky
 Lizzie Compton

References
 Duke, Basil Wilson, A History of Morgan's Cavalry. Cincinnati, Ohio: Miami Printing and Pub. Co., 1867. On-line version
 Gorin-Smith, Betty Jane, 'Morgan Is Coming!': Confederate Raiders in the Heartland of Kentucky. Louisville, Kentucky: Harmony House Publishers, 2006, 452 pp., .
 Horwitz, Lester V., The Longest Raid of the Civil War. Cincinnati, Ohio: Farmcourt Publishing, Inc., 1999. .
Mowery, David L., Morgan's Great Raid: The Remarkable Expedition from Kentucky to Ohio. Charleston, SC: History Press, 2013. .
 Ramage, James A., Rebel Raider: The Life of General John Hunt Morgan. Lexington, Kentucky: University Press of Kentucky, 1986. .
 U.S. War Department, The War of the Rebellion: A Compilation of the Official Records of the Union and Confederate Armies, 70 volumes in 4 series. Washington, D.C.: United States Government Printing Office, 1880-1901. On-line version

Notes

External links
 Commonwealth of Kentucky website for Tebbs Bend
 Tebbs Bend Battlefield Association

Tebbs Bend
National Register of Historic Places in Taylor County, Kentucky
Tebbs Bend
Tebbs Bend
Tebbs Bend
1863 in Kentucky
Tebbs Bend
Historic districts on the National Register of Historic Places in Kentucky
July 1863 events
Conflict sites on the National Register of Historic Places in Kentucky
American Civil War on the National Register of Historic Places